Johnny Dark is a 1954 American Technicolor comedy drama action film directed by George Sherman and starring Tony Curtis, Piper Laurie and Don Taylor. It was produced and distributed by Universal Pictures.

Plot
Johnny Dark and his pal Duke Benson work for Fielding Motors, where owner James Fielding manufactures family-friendly automobiles. Chief engineer Scotty overhears the guys complaining about the company, and spots a sports-car design Johnny and Duke have done.

New employee Liz catches the eye of the guys. Her secret is that she is Fielding's granddaughter. When a major stockholder, Winston, protests the company's unwillingness to create new products for more profits, Scotty blurts out that Fielding Motors is developing a new sports car.

Liz is chosen as the car's designer while Johnny and Duke go to work building it. Duke invites her to go dancing, but is jealous when he spots her kissing Johnny, who has discovered Liz's true identity.

Duke is fired after flipping the car during a practice run. He blames it on brake failure, but Johnny feels it's just an excuse. Liz is disappointed in Johnny for not defending his friend.

The car is entered in a Canada-to-Mexico race. Johnny must drive it himself, Duke having been hired to drive another vehicle. Fielding dislikes making a sports car, but accepts Scotty's wager on the race. The car has a breakdown and Johnny must push it into Las Vegas, but when a radio broadcast implies that Fielding doesn't care, Scotty and a team of mechanics rush to Vegas to help Johnny get back into the race and win, which Liz and Duke help him celebrate.

Cast
 Tony Curtis as Johnny Dark
 Piper Laurie as Liz Fielding
 Don Taylor as Duke Benson
 Paul Kelly as William H. 'Scotty' Scott
 Ilka Chase as Abbie Binns
 Sidney Blackmer as James Fielding
 Ruth Hampton as Miss Border to Border
 Russell Johnson as Emory
 Joe Sawyer as Carl Svenson
 Robert Nichols as Smitty
 Pierre Watkin as Ed J. Winston
 Scatman Crothers as himself
 Ralph Montgomery as Morgan

References

External links
 

American sports comedy films
American action comedy films
1950s sports comedy films
1954 films
1950s action comedy films
American auto racing films
Films directed by George Sherman
Universal Pictures films
1950s English-language films
1950s American films